The Nauts is the second and final studio album by Australian glam rock band The Nauts (formerly known as Supernaut). The album was released in 1979 by Wizard Records.

Track listing
LP/Cassette (ZL 000)

References

1979 albums